The Autopista de la Isla de la Juventud, also known as Autopista Gerona-La Fe, is a Cuban motorway linking Nueva Gerona to Santa Fe (also named La Fe), the principal settlements of the Isla de la Juventud (Isle of Youth).

Route
The motorway is a dual carriageway with 4 lanes and has some at-grade intersections with rural roads. It starts south of Nueva Gerona, from the provincial road "Carretera a Siguanea", between town's center and José Martí ward. After a km, the motorway intersects the east beltway and, after another km, it is an exit connectingt the autopista with Rafael Cabrera Mustelier Airport, 2 km far. The other exits along the route are, in many cases, far from the villages, as the one serving La Demajagua (20 km west). The motorway ends northwest of Santa Fe, where it is divided into a pair of provincial road: one crosses the town in the middle, the other goes close to the western suburb.

See also

Roads in Cuba
Transport in Cuba
Infrastructure of Cuba

References

External links

Autopista Isla Juventud
Isla de la Juventud
Nueva Gerona